Kelch-like protein 7 is a protein that in humans is encoded by the KLHL7 gene.

References

Further reading

External links
  GeneReviews/NCBI/NIH/UW entry on Retinitis Pigmentosa Overview

Kelch proteins